Ingenuus was a Roman military commander, the imperial legate in Pannonia, who became a usurper to the throne of the emperor Gallienus when he led a brief and unsuccessful revolt in the year 260. Appointed by Gallienus himself, Ingenuus served him well by repulsing a Sarmatian invasion and securing the Pannonian border, at least temporarily. Ingenuus had also been charged with the military education of Caesar Cornelius Licinius Valerianus, the young son of Emperor Gallienus, but after the boy's death in 258, his position became perilous. 

A well-liked and admired commander, Ingenuus found an opportunity to become the Roman Emperor when Valerian was captured and killed by Shapur I of the Sassanid Empire. Throwing off their allegiance to Valerian's son, the legions of Moesia proclaimed Ingenuus Roman Emperor at Sirmium in 260.  Gallienus was in Germania on the Rhine frontier, so he acted quickly by recalling troops from Gaul and after a rapid march he met Ingenuus on the battlefield at Mursa.  The troops of Ingenuus were defeated, as Gallienus' general, Aureolus, used to great effect the advantage given by the mobility of an improved cavalry component of the army, which was the remarkable military innovation wanted by the Emperor.

Ingenuus died after the battle by drowning himself in a nearby river to avoid capture.

Notes

References

 
 
 

Gallienus usurpers
3rd-century Roman emperors
Thirty Tyrants (Roman)
260 deaths
Year of birth unknown
Romans from unknown gentes
People from Sirmium
Ancient Romans who committed suicide
Suicides by drowning